The Promenade des Anglais (Niçard: Camin dei Anglés; meaning "Walkway of the English") is a promenade along the Mediterranean coast of Nice, France.  It extends from the airport on the west to the Quai des États-Unis ("United States Quay") on the east, for a distance of approximately 7 km (4.35 miles). Administratively speaking, it forms part of Route nationale 98, which runs between Toulon and Menton.

History
Starting in the second half of the 18th century, the English aristocracy took to spending the winter in Nice, enjoying the panorama along the coast. In 1820, when a particularly harsh winter further north brought an influx of beggars to Nice, some of the English proposed that they could work on the construction of a walkway (chemin de promenade) along the sea.  It was funded by the Reverend Lewis Way and members of Holy Trinity Anglican Church.

The city of Nice, intrigued by the prospect of a pleasant promenade, greatly increased the scope of the work. The Promenade was first called the Camin deis Anglés (the English Way) by the Niçois in their native dialect. After the annexation of Nice by France in 1860 it was rechristened La Promenade des Anglais.

The Promenade was the site of the team time trial in the 2013 Tour de France, held on 2 July 2013. It was also featured as a start and finish location of the first two stages of the 2020 Tour de France.

Modern day
For the local inhabitants, the Promenade des Anglais has simply become the Promenade or, for short, La Prom. It is popular with bicyclists, baby strollers, and families, especially on Sundays. It has also become a favorite place for skateboarders and in-line skaters.

2016 Bastille Day attack

On 14 July 2016, a truck was deliberately driven at revellers celebrating Bastille Day on the Promenade. The driver, 31-year-old Mohamed Lahouaiej-Bouhlel, also shot at others before crossing the road in the vehicle to continue the assault. The vehicle was surrounded by police near the Palais de la Méditerranée, and Bouhlel was shot dead. 86 were killed, and 434 were wounded.

References

External links

Streets in Nice
Tourist attractions in Nice
Waterfronts